The East Asian tailless leaf-nosed bat or tail-less leaf-nosed bat (Coelops frithii) is a species of bat in the family Hipposideridae. It is found in Bangladesh, China, India, Indonesia, Laos, Malaysia, Myanmar, Taiwan, and Vietnam.

The species name commemorates the collector R.W.G. Frith.

References

Coelops
Bats of Asia
Bats of South Asia
Bats of Southeast Asia
Bats of India
Bats of Indonesia
Bats of Malaysia
Mammals of China
Mammals of Bangladesh
Mammals of Myanmar
Mammals of Vietnam
Mammals described in 1848
Taxonomy articles created by Polbot
Taxa named by Edward Blyth